The Speaker is a 2009 British television series, broadcast on BBC Two. It is a talent show type series that aimed to find the best young speaker in the United Kingdom. The show is narrated by Jane Horrocks. The three judges are stand-up comedian Jo Brand, former basketball player and psychologist John Amaechi and Jeremy Stockwell.

Regional auditions were held in London, Glasgow, Cardiff and Manchester. 160 young people were invited to auditions after sending in videos of themselves speaking. The participants had to be aged between 14 and 18. Only 5 participants are allowed through to the next round for each region in episodes 1 & 2. Then the 20 who get through are reduced to 8 after a number of challenges in episode 3.

Airing
The first episode aired on 7 April  2009. The first episode featured the Glasgow and London auditions, while the second show included the Manchester and Cardiff auditions.

Episode list

Finalists

References

External links
 

BBC Television shows
2009 British television series debuts
2009 British television series endings
BBC high definition shows
Educational projects
British awards
Awards established in 2009
Early career awards
English-language television shows